Veselin Gatalo (born 16 December 1967) is a writer and poet from Bosnia and Herzegovina.

Biography 

Veselin Gatalo was born to a Serb family in Mostar, Bosnia and Herzegovina, then part of Yugoslavia. He finished elementary school and high school in his birth town. He entered the Faculty of Engineering and Computer Science in Mostar, but didn't graduate as the Bosnian War started in 1992.

Gatalo is a public commentator and a columnist. He was one of the editors of the Reflex, a political show at the Televizija OBN. Gatalo wrote for a political magazine Status and weekly Republika, and later for Motrišta, Zarez, Album, NIN, Slobodna Bosna, Azra as well as internet portals like Buka, Bljesak.info and Poskok.info. He also wrote for the French magazine Hopala and the Czech magazine Kartki and others.

Works

References

Notes

News reports 

 

1967 births
Living people
Writers from Mostar
Serbs of Bosnia and Herzegovina
Bosnia and Herzegovina poets